= Phedra Clouner =

Belgian cybersecurity professional

Phedra Clouner is a cybersecurity professional active in Belgium. On 10 August 2015, she was appointed to the role of deputy manager to the CCB (Center for Cybersecurity in Belgium, the central authority in charge of cybersecurity in Belgium).

== Studies ==
Phedra Clouner graduated from the Université libre de Bruxelles with a History Major in 2001.

== Career ==
Clouner is the founder and administrator of FedISA Belgium, the Belgian branch of the federation for Information Lifecyle Management, Storage and Archiving.

On 10 August 2015, she was appointed to the role of deputy manager to the CCB (Center for Cybersecurity in Belgium, the central authority in charge of cybersecurity in Belgium). She carries out activities relating to the detection, observation and analysis of online security problems.
